Dotsub is a global software company founded in 2007 and headquartered in New York, New York.  The company's browser-based platform is used for subtitling & translating online videos.  In 2020 Dave Bryant became Dotsub's CEO after several years as its Chief Operating Officer. Dotsub has  personnel throughout the world. In addition to its HQ in New York and offices in the US, it has a significant presence in Rosario, Argentina as well as personnel in  Germany, Italy, Mexico, Czech Republic, Egypt and several other countries.

Dotsub provides a video captioning and translation platform as well as language services for online video.

Dotsub released its latest version of its video translation management system, Dotsub VideoTMS, in 2019, with a complete redesign of the previous version. This latest version provides market leading Video translation project management tools, automated workflows, professional linguist and AI based caption and translation as well as multilevel review capabilities. It is in use by Language Service Providers (LSPs), Localization departments and individual linguists. Dotsub provides services and technology to companies of all sizes all over the world, including  Fortune 100 companies, LSPs and Content Creators.

Dotsub also has a very strong Corporate and Social Responsibility(CSR) ethos, providing its platform for many global wellness initiatives, including Translators Without Borders, Dreamliine and UN sponsored events such as the Mobile Film Festival, with Chairman Michael Smolens very active in CSR and UN SDG projects.

The company was founded by Michael Smolens and Laurie Racine.

References

External links
 Dotsub Official site

2007 establishments in New York City
Companies based in New York City
American companies established in 2007
Technology companies established in 2007
Software companies of the United States